Guangdong Free-Trade Zone (Guangdong FTZ, colloquially known as 广东自由贸易区/广东自贸区 in Chinese), officially China (Guangdong) Pilot Free-Trade Zone is a free-trade zone in Guangdong province, China. It is a free-trade zone near Hong Kong and Macau. The zone covers an area of 116.2 square kilometres and integrates three existing bonded zones in four areas — Nansha New Area in Guangzhou (60 square kilometres), Qianhai and Shekou Industrial Zone (Qianhai Shekou Subdistrict) in Shenzhen (28.2 square kilometres) and Hengqin Subdistrict in Zhuhai (28 square kilometres).

References

External links

Nansha New Area Subdistrict
Qianhai Shekou Subdistrict
Hengqin Subdistrict

Special Economic Zones of China
Economy of Guangdong
2015 establishments in China